Shafeeq Faruk is a Singaporean footballer who plays as a striker for S.League club Young Lions.

Club career 

He was the 2015 Prime League top scorer with 20 goals and was promoted to the senior squad for 2016.  

However, prior to the start of the 2016 season, he was called up by the FAS to join the Young Lions FC.

International career
He also represented the Singapore National U21 team which finished third in the 2015 Vietnam Youth Newspaper Cup.

References

External links 

1997 births
Living people
Singaporean footballers
Association football midfielders
Singapore Premier League players
Young Lions FC players